Hegemony is the political, economic, and military predominance of one state over other states. In Ancient Greece (8th  BC – AD 6th ), hegemony denoted the politico-military dominance of the hegemon city-state over other city-states. In the 19th century, hegemony denoted the "social or cultural predominance or ascendancy; predominance by one group within a society or milieu" and "a group or regime which exerts undue influence within a society".

In theories of imperialism, the hegemonic order dictates the internal politics and the societal character of the subordinate states that constitute the hegemonic sphere of influence, either by an internal, sponsored government or by an external, installed government. The term hegemonism denoted the geopolitical and the cultural predominance of one country over other countries, e.g. the hegemony of the Great Powers established with European colonialism in Africa, Asia, and Latin America.

In Marxist philosophy, Antonio Gramsci defined cultural hegemony as the ruling class's domination of the value system and mores of a society, so that the ruling class perspective is imposed as the world view of society; thus, in the relations among the social classes of a society, the term hegemony describes the cultural dominance of a ruling class, which compels the subordination of the other social classes. 

In International Relations, hegemony is the only great power in a unipolar system.  Its military power is of such capability that no other state has the wherewithal to put up a serious fight against it; its economic power is of the same magnitude, and it is ambitious and willing to impose a certain order on the international system.

Etymology

From the post-classical Latin word hegemonia (1513 or earlier) from the Greek word ἡγεμονία hēgemonía, meaning "authority, rule, political supremacy", related to the word ἡγεμών hēgemōn "leader".

Historical examples

30th–27th centuries BC 
The political pattern of Sumer was hegemony shifting from city to city and called King of Kish. According to the Sumerian King List, Kish established the hegemony yet before the Flood. One of the earliest literary legacies of mankind, the Epic of Gilgamesh, is a case of anti-hegemonic resistance. Gilgamesh fights and overthrows the hegemon of his world.

8th–3rd centuries BC 
In the Greek world of 5th century BC, the city-state of Sparta was the hegemon of the Peloponnesian League (6th to 4th centuries BC) and King Philip II of Macedon was the hegemon of the League of Corinth in 337 BC (a kingship he willed to his son, Alexander the Great). Likewise, the role of Athens within the short-lived Delian League (478–404 BC) was that of a "hegemon". The super-regional Persian Achaemenid Empire of 550 BC–330 BC dominated these sub-regional hegemonies prior to its collapse. Ancient historians such as Herodotus ( – ). Xenophon ( – 354 BC) and Ephorus ( – 330 BC) pioneered the use of the term hēgemonía in the modern sense of hegemony.

In Ancient East Asia, Chinese hegemony existed during the Spring and Autumn period (c. 770–480 BC), when the weakened rule of the Eastern Zhou Dynasty led to the relative autonomy of the Five Hegemons (Ba in Chinese []). The term is translated as lord protector, or lord of the covenants, or chief of the feudal lords and is described as intermediate between king of independent state and Emperor of All under Heaven. The hegemons were appointed by feudal lord conferences and were nominally obliged to support the King of Zhou,  whose status parallel to that of the Roman Pope in the medieval Europe.

In 364 BC, Qin emerged victorious from war and its Duke Xian (424–362 BC) was named hegemon by the King of Zhou. Qin rulers did not preserve the official title of hegemon but in fact kept the hegemony over their world: "For more than one hundred years [before 221 BC] Qin commanded eight lands and brought the lord of equal rank to its court." One of the six other great powers, Wei, was annexed as early as 324 BC. From the reign of Duke Xian on, "Qin gradually swallowed up the six [other] states until, after hundred years or so, the First Emperor was able to bring all kings under his power." 

The century preceding the Qin's wars of unification in 221 BC was dominated by confrontation between the hegemonic horizontal alliance led by Qin and the anti-hegemonic alliance called perpendicular or vertical. “The political world appears as a chaos of ever-changing coalitions, but in which each new combination could ultimately be defined by its relation to Qin." The pattern is an “indication that the Chinese international order during more than a century before the universal conquest was … hegemonic.”

The first anti-hegemonic or perpendicular alliance was formed in 322 BC. Qin was supported by one state, Wei, which it had annexed two years previously. The remaining five great warring states of China joined in the anti-hegemonic coalition and attacked Qin in 318 BC. “Qin, supported by one annexed state, overwhelmed the world coalition.” The same scenario repeated itself several times.) until Qin decisively moved from hegemony to conquests and annexations in 221 BC.

2nd century BC – 15th century AD 

Rome established its hegemony over the entire Mediterranean after its victory over the Seleucid Empire in 189 BC. Officially, Rome’s client states were outside the whole Roman imperium, and preserved their entire sovereignty and international rights and privileges.

With few exceptions, the Roman treaties with client states (foedera) were formulized on equal terms without any expression of clientship and the Romans almost never used the word "client." The term "client king" is an invention of the post-Renaissance scholarship. Those who are conventionally called by modern historians of Rome "client kings" were referred to as "allies and friends" of the Roman people. "Alliance" and "friendship," not any kind of subordination, bound them to Rome.

No regular or formal tribute was extracted from client states. The land of a client state could not officially be a basis for taxation. The overall fact is that, despite extensive conquests, the Romans did not settle down nor extracted revenues in any subdued territories between 200 and 148 BC. The first good evidence for regular taxation of another kingdom comes from Judea as late as 64 BC.

The Roman hegemony of the late Republic left to the Mediterranean kings internal autonomy and obliged not to enter hostile to Rome alliances and not to wage offensive wars without consent of the Senate. Annexations usually followed when client kings broke this order (Macedonia in 148 BC and Pontus in 64 BC). In the course of these and other annexations, Rome gradually evolved from hegemony into empire. The last major client state of the Mediterranean – the Ptolemaic Kingdom  - was annexed by Augustus in the very beginning of his reign in 30 BC. 

Augustus initiated an unprecedented era of peace, shortly after his reign called Pax Romana. This peace however was imperial rather than hegemonic. Classic and modern scholars who call Pax Romana “hegemonic peace,” use the term "hegemony" in its broader sense which includes both hegemony and empire.

From the 7th century to the 12th century, the Umayyad Caliphate and later Abbasid Caliphate dominated the vast territories they governed, with other states like the Byzantine Empire paying tribute.

In 7th century India, Harsha, ruler of a large empire in northern India from AD 606 to 647, brought most of the north under his hegemony. He preferred not to rule as a central government, but left "conquered kings on their thrones and contenting himself with tribute and homage."

From the late 9th to the early 11th century, the empire developed by Charlemagne achieved hegemony in Europe, with dominance over France, most of Northern and Central Italy, Burgundy and Germany.

From the 11th to the late 15th centuries the Italian maritime republics, in particular Venice and Genoa held hegemony in the Mediterranean, dominating trade between Europe and the Orient for centuries, and having naval supremacy. However, with the arrival of the Age of Discovery and the Early modern period, they began to gradually lose their hegemony to other European powers.

16th–19th centuries 

In The Politics of International Political Economy, Jayantha Jayman writes "If we consider the Western dominated global system from as early as the 15th century, there have been several hegemonic powers and contenders that have attempted to create the world order in their own images." He lists several contenders for historical hegemony. Portugal 1494 to 1580 (end of Italian Wars to Spanish-Portuguese Union). Based on Portugal's dominance in navigation.
Spain 1516 to 1659 (Ascension of Charles I of Spain to Treaty of the Pyrenees). Based on the Spanish dominance of the European battlefields and the global exploration and colonization of the New World.
 The Netherlands 1580 to 1688 (1579 Treaty of Utrecht marks the foundation of the Dutch Republic to the Glorious Revolution, William of Orange's arrival in England). Based on Dutch control of credit and money.
 France 1643 to 1763 Since Louis XIV to Seven Years' War
 Britain 1688 to 1792 (Glorious Revolution to Napoleonic Wars). Based on British textiles and command of the high seas.
 French Revolution and Napoleonic France 1789 to 1815
 Britain 1815 to 1914 (Congress of Vienna to The Great War). Based on British industrial supremacy and railroads.

Phillip IV tried to restore the Habsburg dominance but, by the middle of the 17th century "Spain's pretensions to hegemony (in Europe) had definitely and irremediably failed."
 
In late 16th and 17th-century Holland, the Dutch Republic's mercantilist dominion was an early instance of commercial hegemony, made feasible with the development of wind power for the efficient production and delivery of goods and services. This, in turn, made possible the Amsterdam stock market and concomitant dominance of world trade.

In France, King Louis XIV (1638–1715) and (Emperor) Napoleon I (1799–1815) attempted true French hegemony via economic, cultural and military domination of most of Continental Europe. However, Jeremy Black writes that, because of Britain, France "was unable to enjoy the benefits" of this hegemony.

After the defeat and exile of Napoleon, hegemony largely passed to the British Empire, which became the largest empire in history, with Queen Victoria (1837–1901) ruling over one-quarter of the world's land and population at its zenith.  Like the Dutch, the British Empire was primarily seaborne; many British possessions were located around the rim of the Indian Ocean, as well as numerous islands in the Pacific Ocean and the Caribbean Sea. Britain also controlled the Indian subcontinent and large portions of Africa.

In Europe, Germany, rather than Britain, may have been the strongest power after 1871, but Samuel Newland writes:Bismarck defined the road ahead as … no expansion, no push for hegemony in Europe. Germany was to be the strongest power in Europe but without being a hegemon. … His basic axioms were first, no conflict among major powers in Central Europe; and second, German security without German hegemony."

20th century 

The early 20th century, like the late 19th century, was characterized by multiple Great Powers but no global hegemon. World War I strengthened the United States and, to a lesser extent, Japan. Both of these states' governments pursued policies to expand their regional spheres of influence, the US in Latin America and Japan in East Asia. France, the UK, Italy, the Soviet Union and later Nazi Germany (1933–1945) all either maintained imperialist policies based on spheres of influence or attempted to conquer territory but none achieved the status of a global hegemonic power.

After the Second World War, the United Nations was established and the five strongest global powers (China, France, the UK, the US, and the USSR) were given permanent seats on the U.N. Security Council, the organization's most powerful decision making body.

Following the war, the US and the USSR were the two strongest global powers and this created a bi-polar power dynamic in international affairs, commonly referred to as the Cold War.  American hegemony during this time has been described as "Empire by invitation".  The hegemonic conflict was ideological, between communism and capitalism, as well as geopolitical, between the Warsaw Pact countries (1955–1991) and NATO/SEATO/CENTO countries (1949–present/1954-1977/1955-1979). During the Cold War both hegemons competed against each other directly (during the arms race) and indirectly (via proxy wars). The result was that many countries, no matter how remote, were drawn into the conflict when it was suspected that their government's policies might destabilize the balance of power. Reinhard Hildebrandt calls this a period of "dual-hegemony", where "two dominant states have been stabilizing their European spheres of influence against and alongside each other." 
Proxy wars became battle grounds between forces supported either directly or indirectly by the hegemonic powers and included the Korean War, the Laotian Civil War, the Arab–Israeli conflict, the Vietnam War, the Afghan War, the Angolan Civil War, and the Central American Civil Wars.

Following the dissolution of the Soviet Union in 1991 the United States was the world's sole hegemonic power.

21st century 

Various perspectives on whether the US was or continues to be a hegemon have been presented since the end of the Cold War. Most notably, American political scientists John Mearsheimer and Joseph Nye have argued that the US is not a genuine global hegemon because it has neither the financial nor the military resources to impose a proper, formal, global hegemony. This theory is heavily contested in academic discussions of IR, with Anna Beyer being a notable critic of Nye and Mearsheimer. 

The French Socialist politician Hubert Védrine in 1999 described the US as a hegemonic hyperpower, because of its unilateral military actions worldwide.

Pentagon strategist Edward Luttwak, in The Grand Strategy of the Roman Empire, outlined three stages, with hegemonic being the first, followed by imperial. In his view the transformation proved to be fatal and eventually led to the fall of the Roman Empire. His book gives implicit advice to Washington to continue the present hegemonic strategy and refrain from establishing an empire.

In 2006, author Zhu Zhiqun claimed that China is already on the way to becoming the world hegemon and that the focus should be on how a peaceful transfer of power can be achieved between the US and China, but has faced opposition to this claim. According to the recent study published in 2019, the authors argued that a "third‐way hegemony" or Dutch‐style hegemony apart from a peaceful or violent hegemonic rise may be the most feasible option to describe China in its global hegemony in the future.

Political science 

In the historical writing of the 19th century, the denotation of hegemony extended to describe the predominance of one country upon other countries; and, by extension, hegemonism denoted the Great Power politics (c. 1880s – 1914) for establishing hegemony (indirect imperial rule), that then leads to a definition of imperialism (direct foreign rule). In the early 20th century, in the field of international relations, the Italian Marxist philosopher Antonio Gramsci developed the theory of cultural domination (an analysis of economic class) to include social class; hence, the philosophic and sociologic theory of cultural hegemony analysed the social norms that established the social structures (social and economic classes) with which the ruling class establish and exert cultural dominance to impose their Weltanschauung (world view)—justifying the social, political, and economic status quo—as natural, inevitable, and beneficial to every social class, rather than as artificial social constructs beneficial solely to the ruling class.

From the Gramsci analysis derived the political science denotation of hegemony as leadership; thus, the historical example of Prussia as the militarily and culturally predominant province of the German Empire (1871–1918); and the personal and intellectual predominance of Napoleon Bonaparte upon the French Consulate (1799–1804). Contemporarily, in Hegemony and Socialist Strategy (1985), Ernesto Laclau and Chantal Mouffe defined hegemony as a political relationship of power wherein a sub-ordinate society (collectivity) perform social tasks that are culturally unnatural and not beneficial to them, but that are in exclusive benefit to the imperial interests of the hegemon, the superior, ordinate power; hegemony is a military, political, and economic relationship that occurs as an articulation within political discourse. Beyer analysed the contemporary hegemony of the United States at the example of the Global War on Terrorism and presented the mechanisms and processes of American exercise of power in 'hegemonic governance'.

According to John Mearsheimer, global hegemony is unlikely due to the difficulties in projecting power over large bodies of water.

International relations 
In the field of International Relations, hegemony generally refers to the ability of an actor to shape the international system. Usually this actor is a state, such as Britain in the 19th century or the United States in the 20th century. A hegemon may shape the international system through coercive and non-coercive means.

The English school of international relations takes a broader view of history. The research of Adam Watson was world-historical in scope. For him, hegemony was the most common order in history (historical "optimum") because many provinces of “frank” empires were under hegemonic rather than imperial rule. Watson summarized his life-long research: There was a spectrum of political systems ranging between multiple independent states and universal empire. The further a political system evolved towards one of the extremes, the greater was the gravitational pull towards the hegemonic center of the spectrum.

Hegemony may take different forms. Benevolent hegemons provide public goods to the countries within their sphere of influence. Coercive hegemons exert their economic or military power to discipline unruly or free-riding countries in their sphere of influence. Exploitative hegemonies extract resources from other countries. 
 
A prominent theory in International Relations focusing on the role of hegemonies is hegemonic stability theory. Its premise is that a hegemonic power is necessary to develop and uphold a stable international political and economic order. The theory was developed in the 1970s by Robert Gilpin and Stephen D. Krasner, among others. It has been criticized on both conceptual and empirical grounds. For example, Robert Keohane has argued that the theory is not a proper theory because it amounts to a series of allegedly redundant claims that apparently could not be used predictively.

A number of International Relations scholars have examined the decline of hegemons and their orders. For some, such decline tends to be disruptive because the stability that the hegemon provided gives way to a power vacuum. Others have maintained that cooperation may persist in the face of hegemonic decline because of institutions or enhanced contributions from non-hegemonic powers.

There has been a long debate in the field about whether American hegemony is in decline. As early as in the 1970s, Robert Gilpin suggested that the global order maintained by the United States would eventually decline as benefits from the public goods provided by Washington would diffuse to other states. In the 1980s, some scholars singled out Japan's economic growth and technological sophistication as a threat to U.S. primacy. More recently, analysts have focused on the economic and military rise of China and its challenge to U.S. hegemony.

Scholars differ as to whether bipolarity or unipolarity is likely to produce the most stable and peaceful outcomes. Kenneth Waltz and John Mearsheimer are among those who argue that bipolarity tends to generate relatively more stability, whereas John Ikenberry and William Wohlforth are among those arguing for the stabilizing impact of unipolarity. Some scholars, such as Karl Deutsch and J. David Singer argued that multipolarity was the most stable structure.

Scholars disagree about the sources and stability of U.S. unipolarity. Realist international relations scholar argue that unipolarity is rooted in the superiority of U.S. material power since the end of the Cold War. Liberal international relations scholar John Ikenberry attributes U.S. hegemony in part to what he says are commitments and self-restraint that the United States established through the creation of international institutions (such as the United Nations, International Monetary Fund, World Bank, and World Trade Organization). Constructivist scholar Martha Finnemore argues that legitimation and institutionalization are key components of unipolarity.

Sociology 
Academics have argued that in the praxis of hegemony, imperial dominance is established by means of cultural imperialism, whereby the leader state (hegemon) dictates the internal politics and the societal character of the subordinate states that constitute the hegemonic sphere of influence, either by an internal, sponsored government or by an external, installed government. The imposition of the hegemon's way of life—an imperial lingua franca and bureaucracies (social, economic, educational, governing)—transforms the concrete imperialism of direct military domination into the abstract power of the status quo, indirect imperial domination. 0] Brutt-Griffler, a critic of this view, has described it as "deeply condescending" and "treats people ... as blank slates on which global capitalism's moving finger writes its message, leaving behind another cultural automaton as it moves on."

Culturally, hegemony also is established by means of language, specifically the imposed lingua franca of the hegemon (leader state), which then is the official source of information for the people of the society of the sub-ordinate state. Writing on language and power, Andrea Mayr says, "As a practice of power, hegemony operates largely through language." In contemporary society, an example of the use of language in this way is in the way Western countries set up educational systems in African countries mediated by Western languages.

Suggested examples of cultural imperialism include the latter-stage Spanish and British Empires, the 19th- and 20th-century Reichs of unified Germany (1871–1945), and by the end of the 20th century, the United States.

Media studies 
Adopted from the work of Gramsci and Stuart Hall, hegemony with respect to media studies refers to individuals or concepts that become most dominant in a culture. Building on Gramsci's ideas, Hall stated that the media is a critical institution for furthering or inhibiting hegemony.

See also 

 1954 Guatemalan coup d'état
 Noam Chomsky
 Colonialism
 Cultural hegemony
 Dominant ideology
 David Harvey
 Hegemonic masculinity
 Hegemonic stability theory
 Imperialism, the Highest Stage of Capitalism
 Media hegemony
 Monetary hegemony
 Post-hegemony
 Regional hegemony
 Soft power
 Edward Soja
 State collapse
 Supremacism

References

Further reading 
 Anderson, Perry (2017). The H-Word: The Peripeteia of Hegemony. London: Verso.

External links 

 
 
 
 
 

 
International relations theory
Marxist theory
Empires